Roger Paquin (born July 24, 1947) is a Quebec politician. He served as the member for Saint-Jean in the Quebec National Assembly as a member of the Parti Québécois from 1994 until 2003.

Biography

Paquin was born in Montreal, He earned a Bachelor of Arts degree, a Bachelor of Science degree in Biology, and a master's degree in science didactics from the Université de Montréal. He obtained a certificate in cognitive style mapping from Oakland Community College and a certificate in project management from the Université du Québec à Trois-Rivières.

Paquin was a Professor of Biology at the Cégep de Saint-Jean-sur-Richelieu and served as a professional in the General Directorate of Collegial Education at the Quebec Ministry of Education.

Political career

Paquin served as secretary and later the president of his local PQ riding executive. He later became Chairman of the National Council of the provincial party. He ran in Saint-Jean in 1994; the election ended in a tie between him and Liberal incumbent Michel Charbonneau with 16,536 votes each. A by-election was called and a month later Paquin won by 532 votes. He was re-elected without any difficulty in 1998.

He was Parliamentary Secretary to the Minister responsible for the Montérégie Region in the Bouchard government. He then became Parliamentary Secretary to the Minister of the Environment, and then the Parliamentary Secretary to the Minister of the Environment and Water in both the Bouchard and the Landry governments.

Paquin sought re-election in 2003, and lost to Liberal Jean-Pierre Paquin (no relation).

Electoral record

Provincial

References 

1947 births
Living people
Academics from Montreal
Canadian biologists
Canadian educators
Parti Québécois MNAs
Politicians from Montreal
Université de Montréal alumni
Université du Québec à Trois-Rivières alumni
20th-century Canadian politicians
21st-century Canadian politicians